Amadina is a genus of estrildid finches that are found in Africa.

Taxonomy
The genus Amadina was introduced in 1827 by the English naturalist William John Swainson with the cut-throat finch as the type species. The name Amadina is a corrupted diminutive of the genus name Ammodramus, the genus of several American sparrows. Swainson thought the cut-throat finch formed a link between that genus and the genus Estrilda, and created the name to reflect that linkage.

Species
The genus contains two species:

References

 
Bird genera
Estrildidae